The 2017 Fordham Rams football team represented Fordham University in the 2017 NCAA Division I FCS football season. They were led by second-year head coach Andrew Breiner and played their home games at Coffey Field as a member of the Patriot League. They finished the season 4–7, 3–3 in Patriot League play to finish in a three-way tie for third place.

On December 5, head coach Andrew Breiner resigned to become the quarterbacks coach at Mississippi State. He finished at Fordham with a two-year record of 12–10.

Schedule
The 2017 schedule consists of five home and six away games. The Rams will host Patriot League foes Lehigh, Holy Cross, and Bucknell, and will travel to Lafayette, Colgate, and Georgetown.

In 2017, Fordham's non-conference opponents will be Independent Army, Central Connecticut and Bryant of the Northeast Conference, Eastern Washington of the Big Sky Conference, and Yale of the Ivy League.

Game summaries

at Army

at Central Connecticut

Eastern Washington

at Bryant

Yale

at Lafayette

at Colgate

at Georgetown

Lehigh

Holy Cross

Bucknell

Ranking movements

2018 NFL Draft

References

Fordham
Fordham Rams football seasons
Fordham Rams football